The Department of Transport and Construction was an Australian government department that existed between May 1982 and March 1983. It was announced by Prime Minister Malcolm Fraser to "carry out functions relating to road, rail and sea transport and assume responsibility for the Commonwealth construction activities of the (abolished) Department of Housing and Construction."

According to the Administrative Arrangements Order (AAO) made on 15 December 1993, the Department dealt with:
Shipping and marine navigation (including lighthouses, lightships, beacons and buoys)
Land transport
Planning, execution and maintenance of Commonwealth Government works
Design and maintenance of furniture, furnishings and fittings for the Commonwealth Government.

Structure
The Department was an Australian Public Service department responsible to the Minister for Transport and Construction, Ralph Hunt. Department officials were headed by a Secretary, Rae Taylor.

References

Transport and Construction
Ministries established in 1982
1982 establishments in Australia
1983 disestablishments in Australia
Defunct transport organisations based in Australia